The Archbishop Porter Girls' Senior High School (abbreviated as APGSHS) is a Catholic senior secondary school for girls, located in Takoradi in the Western Region of Ghana. The female second cycle institution operates within the Ghana Public Education System. It was founded in 1965 by Rev. Kodjo Amissah with the name St. Louis Secondary School, which was later changed to Archbishop Porter Girls. It welcomes girls of all religious denominations. The school is situated on a hill in Fijai, Takoradi and it has come to be known as the "Hill of Tranquility" for its peaceful and serene academic atmosphere.

History
 
The school was established in 1965 by John Kwadjo Amissah. The first Ghanaian Headmistress was Marian Andoh-Kesson.

Achievements

In 2007 the school won the Western regional round of the i2CAP-"I Too Can Program" computer programming competition.
In 2011 the school was adjudged the best school in the western region based on the results of the West African Examination Council.
In 2013, the school was adjudged winners of the 'project citizen' showcase in Ghana which required high school students to address major issues concerning the country
In 2017, the school represented Ghana in the annual World Robotics competition in the United States.
In 2021, the school was crowned the 2021 National Science and Maths Quiz Western Zonal Champions.

Notable alumni
There are different alumni groups for this school. Old students of Archbishop Porter Girls Senior High School in the United Kingdom are known as The Archbishop Porter Past Students Association in the UK (APPSA UK).
 Nana Aba Appiah Amfo, linguist and the Vice-Chancellor of the University of Ghana
 Ama Ampofo, actress and model
 Millicent Clarke, Regional Human Resources Director – Africa & Middle East for Standard Chartered Bank

 Joselyn Dumas, television host and actress
 Yvonne Nduom, wife of Paa Kwesi Nduom, the leader of Progressive People's Party in Ghana
 Zita Okaikoi, politician and a former Minister for Tourism
 Adowarim Lugu Zuri, entrepreneur

References

Boarding schools in Ghana
Educational institutions established in 1965
1965 establishments in Ghana
Girls' schools in Ghana
Education in the Western Region (Ghana)
Catholic secondary schools in Ghana